Kateryna Bondarenko and Sharon Fichman were the defending champions but chose not to participate.

Caroline Dolehide and Asia Muhammad won the title, defeating Heather Watson and Zheng Saisai in the final, 6–2, 6–3.

Seeds

Draw

Draw

References

External Links
Main Draw

Monterrey Open - Doubles
2021 Doubles